The Stationers' Company's School was a former boys' grammar school, then a comprehensive school in Hornsey, north London.

History
The school started as the Stationers' Company's Foundation School. The Master from 1858 to 1882 was Alexander Kennedy Isbister. In 1861 it was established at Bolt Court near Fleet Street. In 1891 it moved to Mayfield Road in Hornsey, northeast from Crouch End.

Grammar school
The speech night was sometimes held at the Hornsey Town Hall and early on at the Stationers' Hall. The analogous girls' school was Hornsey High School, which became Hornsey Secondary School for Girls. In 1933 the school was extended and a new assembly hall, gymnasium, dining hall and workshops were accommodated in a new brick extension on Mayfield Road.

Founded as a voluntary aided school, it became voluntary controlled in 1966.

Comprehensive
Stationers' Company's Grammar School became a comprehensive boys' school in 1967, merging first with Priory Vale School in Hornsey and then with William Forster School in Tottenham before closing in 1983. The buildings were totally demolished and part of the grounds turned into Stationers' Park, with the balance developed as housing.

Alumni

 Captain William (Bill) Steele, SOE instructor and operational in Burma 1945, mentioned in dispatches.
 David Pascoe Aiers British diplomat
 Anthony Beattie, Chief Executive from 1990-6 of the Natural Resources Institute, Chatham
 Gerald Bonner, Early Church historian and scholar of religion, Durham University and Catholic University of America. 
 Prof Alexander Boksenberg CBE, Director from 1993-6 of the Royal Observatories, and Professor of Physics and Astronomy from 1978–81 at University College London
 Colin Chapman CBE, engineer and inventor who founded Lotus Cars
 Benjamin Dale, composer
 Meredith Davies CBE, conductor and Organist from 1949-56 of Hereford Cathedral
 Frank Dickens, cartoonist, drawing Bristow for the Evening Standard
 Franklin Engelmann, radio broadcaster who hosted Down Your Way from 1955–72
 John Grant, Labour MP from 1970-4 for Islington East, and from 1974-83 for Islington Central (SDP from 1981)
 Eric Hosking OBE, ornithologist and photographer
 Philip Mairet, designer
 Richard Muir CMG, Ambassador to Kuwait from 1999–2002, and to Oman from 1994-9
 Stanford Robinson OBE, conductor
 Barry Took (initially), comedy writer and TV presenter
 David Triesman, Baron Triesman, Chairman from 2008-10 of The Football Association, General Secretary from 1993-2001 of the Association of University Teachers (AUT), and General Secretary of the Labour Party from 2001-3
 Major Wilfrid Vernon, aircraft designer and Labour MP from 1945-51 for Dulwich
 Stephen Platten, Bishop of Wakefield since 2003
 David Motton, Script writer for comics Eagle, Dandy, Wizard, Hotspur, Tell Me Why etc. including Dan Dare, Desperate Dan, Jet Ace Logan
 M. Saiful Islam, Chemistry Professor at University of Bath and 2016 Royal Institution Christmas Lecturer.

See also
 Worshipful Company of Stationers and Newspaper Makers

References

External links
 Old Stationers'

Defunct grammar schools in England
Defunct schools in the London Borough of Haringey
Educational institutions disestablished in 1983
Educational institutions established in 1861
1861 establishments in England
1983 disestablishments in England
Hornsey